Thallium triiodide is a chemical compound of thallium and iodine with formula . Unlike the other thallium trihalides, which contain thallium(III),  is a thallium(I) salt and contains the triiodide ion, .

An appreciation as to why Tl+ is not oxidised to Tl3+ in the reaction:

 Tl3+  +  2 I− → Tl+  +  I2

can be gained by considering the  standard reduction potentials  of the half cells which are:

 Tl3+ + 2  → Tl+;Er° = 1.252
 I2 + 2  → 2 I−;Er° = 0.5355

The favoured reaction is therefore the reduction of Tl3+ to Tl+ (1.252 > 0.5355).

Using standard electrode potentials in this way must be done with caution as factors such as complex formation and solvation may affect the reaction. TlI3 is no exception as it is possible to stabilise thallium(III) with excess I− forming the  ion (isoelectronic with the tetraiodomercurate anion and with lead(IV) iodide).

Structure and preparation
TlI3 is formulated , and has a similar structure to NH4I3, CsI3 and RbI3. The triiodide ion in TlI3 is nearly linear but is asymmetric with one iodine–iodine bond longer than the other. For comparison the dimensions of the triiodide, Ia–Ib–Ic, ions in the different compounds are shown below:

TlI3 can be prepared by the evaporation of stoichiometric quantities of thallium(I) iodide and iodine in concentrated aqueous hydriodic acid, or by reacting TlI with iodine in ethanol.

References
 WebElements
 

Thallium(I) compounds
Iodides
Metal halides
Polyhalides